Pavol Ďurica (born 17 May 1983) is a former Slovak football midfielder

In early 2008 he joined the Hungarian team FC Fehérvár on loan from Artmedia Bratislava, where he played only four games, but during this short period he scored a remarkable own goal against Debreceni VSC in the Hungarian Cup quarter final on 27 March 2008. The match was heading towards extra time, when Debrecen was awarded a penalty in the last minute, which was saved by the goalkeeper of FC Fehérvár, but the ball bounced back to the penalty spot and the arriving Ďurica, desperately wanting to clear to the stands, hammered it into his own goal clipping the post.

The video of the own goal immediately became a major hit on the internet, producing millions of downloads within only a few days.

A few days after this match Ďurica was released from FC Fehérvár because he failed to show up for a match with the reserves.

He is the brother of Slovak international Ján Ďurica.

External links 
HLSZ 

Own goal against DVSC in Hungarian Cup

1983 births
Living people
Slovak footballers
Expatriate footballers in Hungary
Expatriate footballers in Austria
FC Petržalka players
Partizán Bardejov players
FC DAC 1904 Dunajská Streda players
Fehérvár FC players
Slovak Super Liga players
Association football midfielders